Mosaic Select 23: Andrew Hill is a 3-disc box set of solo recordings by American pianist Andrew Hill for Fantasy Records in 1978. All tracks, with the exception of two, were previously unreleased.

Track listing
All tracks previously unreleased unless otherwise noted.
All compositions by Andrew Hill unless otherwise noted.

References

Andrew Hill albums
2007 compilation albums
Solo piano jazz albums